Algiers Jameal William Dillon Jr. (born May 2, 1998) is an American football running back for the Green Bay Packers of the National Football League (NFL). He played college football at Boston College.

Early life and high school career
Dillon grew up in Connecticut. While on the high school football team at New London High School as a freshman, Dillon played sparingly. At that point, he was recruited to Lawrence Academy in Groton, Massachusetts, a private boarding school. Dillon played four years at Lawrence and was clearly the focus of the team's offense by his second year when he rushed for 1321 yards and 21 touchdowns while also starring at linebacker. As a junior, he rushed for 1,887 yards and 26 touchdowns. As a senior, he played in only four games due to a broken leg but still rushed for 635 yards with 12 touchdowns. He ran a 4.56 40-yard dash and was named MVP of Nike's Opening. Dillon originally committed to the University of Michigan to play college football but eventually flipped his commitment and signed with Boston College.

College career

Freshman season
As a freshman at Boston College in 2017, Dillon played in all 13 games and rushed for a freshman school record 1,589 yards on 300 carries with 14 touchdowns. He was named the ACC Rookie of the Year.

Sophomore season
In his sophomore season, Dillon played in only 10 of 13 games, due to an ankle injury suffered against Temple on September 29, 2018. Despite being somewhat limited due to his injury, Dillon still recorded 1,149 total yards and 11 touchdowns, making him the first player in Boston College history to post back-to-back 1,000-yard seasons.  The Eagles officially did not make postseason, as the First Responder Bowl was declared a no-contest after lightning early in the game.  In the short time before lightning ended the event, he ran for 33 yards on six carries, including a touchdown run of 19 yards.

Junior season
In a game against Clemson on October 26, 2019, Dillon scored his 34th touchdown at Boston College with a 9-yard rush in the second quarter that tied him with Keith Barnette for Eagles' career rushing touchdowns record. Then in the third quarter, Dillon rushed for another 9 yards for 3,739 career rushing yards that tied him with Andre Williams' record set in 2013.

On December 10, 2019, Dillon gave up his senior year eligibility at Boston College and declared for the 2020 NFL Draft. Dillon holds the program's all-time rushing record with 4,382 yards in three seasons and is 220 yards short of the Atlantic Coast Conference career rushing record. His 38 career rushing touchdowns, 40 total touchdowns and 4,618 all-purpose yards are also program records.

College statistics

Professional career

Dillon was drafted by the Green Bay Packers with the 62nd pick in the second round of the 2020 NFL Draft. He signed his four-year rookie contract on July 1, 2020, worth $5.3 million, with a signing bonus of $1.4 million.

2020
Head coach Matt LaFleur named Dillon the third running back on the Packers' depth chart to begin the season, behind veterans Aaron Jones and Jamaal Williams. He saw his first NFL action on September 13, 2020, during a Week 1 victory over the Minnesota Vikings, logging two carries for 14 yards. The following week over the Detroit Lions, Dillon rushed 5 times for 17 yards as the Packers won 42–21. He saw no action during the Packers' Week 3 victory over the New Orleans Saints, and had just one carry for 3 yards against the Atlanta Falcons the following week. In each of their next three games, Dillon carried the ball five times apiece, tallying 31, 11 and 21 yards in those games. The Packers placed Dillon on the reserve/COVID-19 list on November 2, 2020, where he missed five games. He was activated from the list on December 10, 2020, ahead of the Packers' Week 14 game versus the Lions, but Dillon did not record any stats in that game. He carried the ball once for 18 yards versus the Carolina Panthers in Week 15.

On December 27, 2020, Dillon scored his first two NFL touchdowns during a Week 16 game against the Tennessee Titans on Sunday Night Football, totaling 124 rushing yards on 21 carries during the 40–14 win. During the Packers' divisional round matchup against the Los Angeles Rams, Dillon rushed 6 times for 27 yards as Green Bay won 32–18, and had a fumble recovered by quarterback Aaron Rodgers. The following week against the Tampa Bay Buccaneers, Dillon rushed 3 times for 17 yards, and added one catch for 13 yards, as the Packers lost 31–26.

In total, Dillon had 46 carries for 242 yards (an average of 5.3 yards per carry) and 2 touchdowns during his rookie season.

2021
After teammate Jamaal Williams left in free agency, Dillon was named the second-string running back to begin the season. Dillon had a slow start to the season, averaging just 5 carries a game through the first 3 weeks of the season. He saw his first significant action in a Week 4 victory over the Pittsburgh Steelers, tallying 15 carries for 81 yards, and catching one pass for 16 yards, as the Packers won 27–17. The following week versus the Cincinnati Bengals, Dillon saw 30 rushing yards on 8 carries, and added 4 catches for 49 yards and a touchdown. The Packers won 25–22 in overtime.

Dillon tied a career-high 21 carries for 66 yards and 2 rushing touchdowns in a Week 10 victory over the Seattle Seahawks. In that same game, teammate Aaron Jones went down with an MCL injury. Dillon started the Packers' Week 11 game against the Minnesota Vikings, notching 11 carries for 53 yards, and adding 6 catches for 44 yards, as the Packers lost 34–31. Dillon carried the ball 20 times for 69 yards against the Los Angeles Rams the following week, and caught 5 passes for 21 yards, as the Packers won 36–28. He recorded a 2-touchdown performance for the third time in his career in a 37–10 Week 16 victory over the Vikings, carrying the ball 14 times for 63 yards and adding 2 catches for 20 yards.

NFL career statistics

Regular season

Postseason

Personal life
Dillon is of African-American and Jewish heritage. His grandfather, Thom Gatewood, was an All-American college football player at the University of Notre Dame and the captain of the 1972 team as well as a member of the College Football Hall of Fame.

Dillon has co-hosted the "Toonen to Dillon" podcast with Will Toonen since December 2021. He married Toonen's sister Gabrielle on June 25, 2022.

Dillon is an avid promoter of Door County, Wisconsin, having first visited there after he started playing in Green Bay.  In November 2021 he was given the key to Door County by Destination Door County, being the only person to receive the honor. Dillon married his wife, Gabrielle, on June 26, 2022, in Door County.

References

External links
Green Bay Packers bio
Boston College Eagles bio

Living people
1998 births
Players of American football from Baltimore
American football running backs
Boston College Eagles football players
Green Bay Packers players
Jewish American sportspeople